Sardabeh Rural District is in the Central District of Ardabil County, Ardabil province, Iran. At the census of 2006, its population was 20,579 in 4,567 households; there were 20,446 inhabitants in 5,399 households at the following census of 2011; and in the most recent census of 2016, it had decreased to 19,396 in 5,591 households. The largest of its 41 villages was Khiarak, with 3,287 people.

References 

Ardabil County

Rural Districts of Ardabil Province

Populated places in Ardabil Province

Populated places in Ardabil County